Lake Koman Ferry (Albanian: Trageti i Komanit) is a passenger ferry service operated by several local companies along the Koman Reservoir (also known as Koman Lake) in Northern Albania. The line operates between Koman near the Koman Hydroelectric Power Station, and Fierzë near the Fierza Hydroelectric Power Station. The line is known for its scenic views of the mountain gorges, unscheduled stops along the way for serving locals, and the peculiar atmosphere of both locals, foreigners, and even animals being fitted on board up to full capacity. According to Bradt Travel guides, the journey is described as "one of the world's great boat trips" only comparable to the Scandinavian fjords.

History
Following the construction of the dam and inundation of the area, a ferry service was established to serve the local population. Since the 2000s, the area has become a growing tourist destination. As a result, the old car ferry ship Dardania underwent a complete makeover and began regular trips in May 2015 with the new name Alpin Ferry. Between June 2012 and April 2014, the Jezerca X car ferry was no longer running. The new A1 highway connecting the Albanian coast with Kukes and Kosovo made it redundant and allowed for the Dardania ship makeover. Presently, several private companies offer custom tours packages with acceptable vessels.  

Also, there is the Dragobia Boat (the cabin of which was converted from a bus), which has been operating in the lake since 1994. Now they also have the Berisha Ferry, which can carry up to 5 cars.

Schedule
As of May 2015, the revamped car ferry ship was re-introduced running every day with a new timetable.

The car ferry departs daily, and the crossing takes two hours. Other ferry services such as Berisha have an inverted schedule. Schedule changes in the winter season to accommodate lower ridership.

Transportation
Furgons (minibuses) serve the area and are usually located at the ferry docking stations. Furgons depart from Shkoder at about 06:00 in the morning near Hotel Rozafa on Democracy Square (Sheshi Demokracia).

Gallery

See also
Geography of Albania
 Albanian Alps
 Tourism in Albania
 Transport in Albania

References

External links

Ferry operators
 Komani Lake Explore/ Kayak Tour Boat DRAGOBIA 
 Berisha Car Ferry/Komani Lake
 Mario Molla Komani Lake 
 Alpin Car Ferry 
 Small boats to get to shala river  
Water transport in Albania
Tourism in Albania